BTN may refer to:

 Bhutan, a country in South Asia (ISO 3166-1 alpha-3 country code: BTN)
 Bhutanese ngultrum, the currency of Bhutan by ISO 4217 currency code
Bauxite and Northern Railway, a railroad operating in Arkansas, United States
 Behind the News, an educational news & current affairs programme for children in Australia 
 Beyond the Neighbourhood, a 2007 album by an English indie rock band Athlete
 Big Ten Network, a regional sports television network in the United States
 Biro Tata Negara (National Civics Bureau), a Malaysian government agency
 Botanic Gardens MRT station, Singapore (MRT station abbreviation BTN)
 Bornfree Technologies Network, a private television broadcaster from West Nile, Uganda
Bank Tabungan Negara, a bank in Indonesia
 British Television Network, a fictional British state television broadcaster in the film V for Vendetta
 Marlboro County Jetport, an airport near Bennettsville, South Carolina, United States (IATA airport code BTN)
 Brighton railway station, a railway station in Sussex, England